Gaston Hall is an auditorium located on the third and fourth floors of the north tower of Healy Hall on Georgetown University's main campus in Washington, D.C. Named for Georgetown's first student, William Gaston, who also helped secure the university's federal charter, Gaston Hall was completed in 1901, around twenty years after the construction of the building within which it is housed.

The 740-seat hall (including orchestra and balcony) is today used for numerous occasions including convocations and honorary degree ceremonies, theatrical and musical performances, and speeches. Gaston Hall has gained a reputation for hosting prominent heads of state, political leaders, and other public figures.

Architecture 

Gaston Hall is often referred to as the "jewel in the crown" of Georgetown's campus due to its ornate interior and grand adornments. The ceiling line bears the coats of arms of the sixty Jesuit universities in the world at the time of Gaston's construction, all beneath a decorated wood ceiling. In addition, a number of classical allegorical scenes that fill the walls were painted freehand (without a stencil) by Francis Schroen, a Jesuit Brother who was a reputed interior designer and painter of Catholic institutions and several other rooms with Healy Hall. Behind the stage are paintings of Athena, goddess of wisdom, and a "classically draped male." He painted two large murals above the stage, the left symbolically depicting Morality, Faith, and Patriotism, and the right depicting Art, Alma Mater, and Science.

The center of the stage contains a wooden decorative structure that displays the Georgetown University seal and an IHS Christogram. This Christogram was the center of some controversy when it was covered by a piece of black plywood at the request of the White House for a speech by President Obama on the stage of Gaston Hall.

Hosted speakers 
Due to its significant place in Georgetown's history, Gaston Hall has hosted numerous prominent individuals to speak. In addition to university events such as the Philodemic Society's Merrick Debate and the South Asian cultural show Rangila, in recent times, Gaston Hall has been host to (among others):

Politics and government:

 Senator Elizabeth Warren

Public life:

 Entrepreneur Mark Zuckerberg
 Comedian John Mulaney

See also 

 List of Georgetown University buildings

References 

Georgetown University buildings
School buildings completed in 1901
1901 establishments in Washington, D.C.